Iulota ochropolia is a moth of the family Gelechiidae. It was described by Turner in 1939. It is found in Australia, where it has been recorded from Tasmania.

The wingspan is about 12 mm. The forewings are whitish finely sprinkled with pale grey. The hindwings are pale grey.

References

Moths described in 1939
Iulota